This is the list of municipalities that have the Quebec municipality type of city (ville, code=V), an administrative division defined by the Ministry of Municipal Affairs, Regions and Land Occupancy.

Note that although the terms "city" and "town" are both used in the category name because of common English usage, Quebec does not contain any cities under the current law; this list thus includes all villes, regardless of whether they are referred to as cities or towns in English.

List

Notes:

References 

 
Quebec
Cities